Unearthed & Untold: The Path to Pet Sematary is a 2017 American documentary film written, produced and directed by John Campopiano and Justin White. The film chronicles the making of Pet Sematary, a 1989 horror film based on Stephen King's eponymous novel.

Plot
Unearthed & Untold shows the making of the 1989 film Pet Sematary. It contains interviews with several cast and crew members who participated, including its main actors, director Mary Lambert, producers, etc. The film also contains several "behind the stage" scenes.

Cast
 Brad Greenquist as himself
 Sean Clark as himself
 Susan Blommaert as herself
 Denise Crosby as herself
 Miko Hughes as himself
 Dale Midkiff as himself
 Mary Lambert as herself

Release

Reception
David Andreas from the website Splatter Critic gave it 21/2 out of 4 stars, stating: "Though nothing astounding or ground breaking is ever put forth, this is still an informative look at the creation of a beloved film. Has enough integral players to make up for the inclusion of those whose input isn't required, which helps fuel authenticity." Dave Heath, writing for the website Cryptic Rock gave the film 31/2 out of 5 stars and said: "Ultimately, despite the occasional drags and the lack of King, it remains an interesting insight into how the world got Pet Sematary. Ardent fans of the film are going to get the most out of it, but with nearly everything and the kitchen sink uncovered, newcomers should find enough to keep them intrigued."

The film was nominated for "Best Documentary" at the 2017 Rondo Hatton Classic Horror Awards.

References

External links
 
 

2017 films
2017 documentary films
Documentary films about films
Documentary films about horror
2010s English-language films